Roger Porter may refer to:

 Roger B. Porter (born 1946), American professor of business and government
 J. Roger Porter (1909–1979), microbiologist